Éric Martin (born 8 August 1973) is a French former footballer who played as a defender.

Career 
Martin played his first and only match for Rennes on 16 March 1991. He was in the starting lineup for an eventual 3–1 Division 1 loss to Lille, having been replaced during the match by Moussa Traoré. Martin went on to play for Caen and La Vitréenne before retiring from his football career.

References 

1973 births
Living people
People from Dinan
French footballers
Association football defenders
Stade Rennais F.C. players
Stade Malherbe Caen players
La Vitréenne FC players
Ligue 1 players
Championnat National 3 players
Championnat National 2 players
Footballers from Brittany
Sportspeople from Côtes-d'Armor